The list of BLS-winning head coaches shows all head coaches who won the Basketball League of Serbia, the top-tier national men's professional basketball league based in Serbia.

Winners

Multiple winners

See also
List of ABA League-winning coaches
List of Radivoj Korać Cup-winning head coaches

References

External links
 Official website 
 Basketball League of Serbia at eurobasket.com

Coaches
BLS-winning head coaches